Eleanor Clymer (née Lowenton; January 7, 1906 – March 31, 2001), was an American children's author, best known for The Trolley Car Family (1947). She graduated from the University of Wisconsin–Madison in 1928 with a degree in English. Between the years of 1943 and 1983 she published 58 books, including The Tiny Little House, My Brother Stevie, and Hamburgers–and Ice Cream for Dessert.

Clymer was born in New York City, the daughter of Russian immigrants. Through much of her life she was a resident of Katonah, New York and an active member of the nearby Unitarian Universalist fellowship. In 1980 she was awarded the Rip Van Winkle award by the School Library Media Specialists of Southeastern New York for outstanding contributions to children's literature.

Her son, Adam Clymer, was a journalist with The New York Times. Clymer died in 2001 at the age of 95 in Haverford, Pennsylvania.

References

External links
 
 Janet Bell at LC Authorities, with 2 records (of picture books with text by Clymer as Bell)
 Elizabeth Kinsey at LC Authorities, with 5 records

1906 births
2001 deaths
American children's writers
American Unitarian Universalists
University of Wisconsin–Madison College of Letters and Science alumni
People from Katonah, New York